"To the Max" is a song written and performed by American musician DJ Khaled, featuring Canadian rapper Drake. The song was released on June 5, 2017 by We the Best and Epic Records as a promotional single from Khaled's tenth studio album, Grateful (2017). It however was removed from the album and legal streaming platforms such as Spotify and Apple Music. The song contains a sample of the 2007 song "Heartbroken" by British artists T2 (who produced it) and Jodie Aysha (who wrote and performed it). American DJ Jayhood remixed "Heartbroken" in 2009 then later in 2015, Haitian-American producer JayO remixed DJ Jayhood's remix of "Heartbroken" and named it "Gus Get Em Right". All the above remixes of "Heartbroken" were used by DJ Khaled without credits to, or permission from T2 and Jodie Aysha. A further sample used includes "Lit" by 1WayFrank.

Composition 
"To the Max" is in the key of D flat major. The tempo is 160 BPM with a time signature of 4/4 time.

Charts

Certifications

References

2017 songs
2017 singles
DJ Khaled songs
Drake (musician) songs
Songs written by Drake (musician)
Songs written by DJ Khaled
Song recordings produced by Cool & Dre
Songs written by Kirk Robinson